Dingolshausen is a municipality in the district of Schweinfurt in Bavaria, Germany.

Located at the foot of the Steigerwald (forest) and in the valley of a creek named the Volkach. Dingolshausen is known for its wineries.

Coat of arms
The coat of arms was given to Dingolshausen in the year 1561. It shows two grapes as a symbol of the winemakers (Winzwer).

History
The first documented mention of Dingolshausen is in 1165, which was later in the year of 1243 ruled by the Bishopric of Würzburg (Hochstift Wuerzburg).

References

Schweinfurt (district)